Rock Ethos Launched in 2008, is an annual rock music festival which aims to promote anti-piracy. The festival’s mission also revolves around encouraging bands to present original songs instead of cover versions. Indian rock bands are allocated 45 minutes to perform their original compositions at the festival. In an attempt to recreate an international rock festival experience, Rock Ethos offers a carnival atmosphere with bungee jumping, paintball contests, and food and refreshment zones serving as added attractions.

Rock Ethos 2008

External links

References
 http://www.deccanherald.com/content/feb152008/metro2008021452287.asp

 

rock festivals in India